Cupertino is a suburb of San Francisco and San Jose, California.

Cupertino may also refer to:

Cupertino effect, a common error in spell checkers
Joseph of Cupertino (1603-1663), Italian Catholic saint
Stevens Creek (California), formerly Cupertino Creek

See also
 
Copertino, a town in the Lecce province of Italy